Bachia marcelae is a species of lizard in the family Gymnophthalmidae. It is endemic to Venezuela.

References

Bachia
Reptiles of Venezuela
Endemic fauna of Venezuela
Reptiles described in 1968
Taxa named by Roberto Donoso-Barros